Duddingston House is an 18th-century mansion in Edinburgh, Scotland, located south-east of the village of Duddingston. It was built in the 1760s for James Hamilton, 8th Earl of Abercorn, and was designed by Sir William Chambers. It is now protected as a category A listed building, and the grounds of the house are included in the Inventory of Gardens and Designed Landscapes in Scotland, the national listing of significant gardens.

History
The lands of Duddingston were purchased by James Hamilton, 8th Earl of Abercorn (1712–1789), in 1745 from the Duke of Argyll. During the Jacobite rising of 1745, Bonnie Prince Charlie's cavalry camped in the park, before the Battle of Prestonpans. In 1760, Lord Abercorn commissioned Sir William Chambers (1723–1796) to design a modest new house, which was constructed between 1763 and 1768. The total cost of the house and pleasure grounds, laid out by Robert Robinson in the style of Capability Brown, was around £30,000. 

After Lord Abercorn's death in 1789, the estate passed to his heirs but the house was let. Its tenants were aristocratic including Francis Rawdon-Hastings, 1st Marquess of Hastings who rented the property for many years and held an infamous garden fete in June 1805 inviting 300 of the Scottish nobility.

The Benhar Coal Mining Company bought a large part of the  estate in the 1880s, and in 1894 Duddingston Golf Club was developed in the grounds. Holyrood High School was built in the park in the 1960s, to the west of the house.

Restoration 
The house was again in disrepair in the 1980s. In the 1990s the stables and service block courtyard of the house were converted into town houses, while the main house was restored by the Burrell Company as offices.

References

External links

 
 Duddingston House web site

Listed houses in Scotland
Category A listed buildings in Edinburgh
Inventory of Gardens and Designed Landscapes
Houses completed in 1768
William Chambers buildings
1768 establishments in Scotland